Charlie Justice is an American politician from the state of Florida. A member of the Democratic Party, Justice serves on the Pinellas County Commission. He was formerly a member of the Florida House of Representatives representing the 53rd district from 2000 to 2006, and the Florida Senate representing the 16th district from 2006 to 2010.

Career
Justice worked as a project coordinator for the University of South Florida St. Petersburg, and as a legislative aide to Lars Hafner, when Hafner represented the 53rd district in the Florida House of Representatives. Justice was elected to the Florida House, representing the 53rd District, in 2000, succeeding Hafner, who could not run for reelection due to term limits. Justice served in the Florida House from 2000 through 2006. He was elected to the Florida Senate, representing the 16th District, in 2006, and was sworn in during 2006.

Justice lost to Republican Party candidate Bill Young

Justice ran for Pinellas County Commission in the 2012 election cycle. He defeated his opponent, incumbent Nancy Bostock.

See also
United States House of Representatives elections in Florida, 2010#District 10

References

External links
Senator Charlie Justice official Florida Senate site
Charlie Justice for U.S. Congress official campaign site
 
Representative Charlie Justice (2001-2006) official Florida House of Representatives site

Democratic Party Florida state senators
Democratic Party members of the Florida House of Representatives
1968 births
Living people
University of South Florida alumni